The Louis Sullivan Bungalow was a vacation home for noted architect Louis Sullivan on the Gulf Coast in Ocean Springs, Mississippi.  It was listed on the National Register of Historic Places for its association with Sullivan and Frank Lloyd Wright, who both claimed credit for its design. It was built in the early 1890s and restored in the 1980s, but was destroyed by Hurricane Katrina in 2005.

References

 Storrer, William Allin. The Frank Lloyd Wright Companion. University Of Chicago Press, 2006,  (S.005)

Bibliography
Wright-Sullivan gems gutted, Chicago Tribune, September 8, 2005. 
Hurricane Katrina devastates Gulf Coast region, severely compromises architectural landscape, Architectural Record, October 2005.

External links
 

1890s architecture in the United States
Bungalow architecture in Mississippi
Frank Lloyd Wright buildings
Louis Sullivan buildings
Houses in Jackson County, Mississippi